Chahargah or Chahar Gah may refer to:

 Chahargah, Kermanshah, Iran
 Chahar Gah, Kurdistan, Iran
 Chahargah, West Azerbaijan
 Chahargah (mode), a Dastgāh of Persian music